Bolewadi is a village in Belgaum district in the southern state of Karnataka, India.
Bolewadi village has higher literacy rate compared to Karnataka. In 2011, literacy rate of Bolewadi village was 79.28 % compared to 75.36 % of Karnataka. In Bolewadi Male literacy stands at 91.26 % while female literacy rate was 67.34 %.

References

http://www.census2011.co.in/data/village/597124-bolewadi-karnataka.html

Villages in Belagavi district